Elections to Surrey County Council took place on 4 June 2009 as part of the 2009 United Kingdom local elections, having been delayed from 7 May in order for the elections to take place alongside those to the European Parliament.

All locally registered electors (British, Irish, Commonwealth and European Union citizens) who were aged 18 or over on Thursday 4 June 2009 were entitled to vote in the local elections. Those who were temporarily away from their ordinary address (for example, away working, on holiday, in student accommodation or in hospital) were also entitled to vote in the local elections, although those who had moved abroad and registered as overseas electors could not vote in the local elections. It is possible to register to vote at more than one address (such as a university student who had a term-time address and lives at home during holidays) at the discretion of the local Electoral Register Office, but it remains an offence to vote more than once in the same local government election. The next election was scheduled for May 2013.

Summary
The Conservatives maintained overall control of the council with a 32-seat majority over all other Parties (56 seats to 24). The Liberal Democrat Group remained the council's official opposition, with 13 seats. The Labour Party lost one of its two seats and retained the other. The one Independent councillor retained his seat.

Summary of results

References

2009 English local elections
2009
2000s in Surrey